Teabamagu is a village in the Solomon Islands, on Rennell Island in the Rennell and Bellona province.

Location
Travel easterly for approx 50 min from Tigoa. (Kanava village located just prior)

Population
70 people approx.

Religion
Life Changing Mission (LCM)

Police
Generally policing is serviced by the Tigoa police station

Populated places in Rennell and Bellona Province